The 2011–12 Scottish Football League Second Division (also known as the 2011–12 Irn Bru Scottish Football League Second Division for sponsorship reasons) is the 17th season in the current format of 10 teams in the third-tier of Scottish football. Livingston F.C. are the current champions.

Teams

As champions of the 2010–11 season, Livingston were directly promoted to the 2011–12 Scottish First Division. They were replaced by Stirling Albion who finished bottom of the 2010–11 Scottish First Division.

A second promotion place was available via a play-off tournament between the ninth-placed team of the 2010–11 Scottish First Division, Cowdenbeath, and the sides ranked second, third and fourth in the 2010–11 Scottish Second Division, Ayr United, Forfar Athletic and Brechin City respectively. The play off was won by Ayr United who defeated Brechin City in the final. Cowdenbeath were therefore relegated and replaced Ayr United.

Peterhead finished bottom at the end of the 2010–11 Scottish Second Division season so were relegated to the 2011–12 Scottish Third Division. They were replaced by Arbroath, the champions of the 2010–11 Scottish Third Division.

The ninth placed team of the 2010–11 Scottish Second Division, Alloa Athletic, entered a play-off tournament with the sides ranked second, third and fourth in the 2010–11 Scottish Third Division, Albion Rovers, Queen's Park and Annan Athletic respectively. The play off was won by Albion Rovers who defeated Annan Athletic in the final. Alloa Athletic were therefore relegated and replaced by Albion Rovers.

Stadia and locations

Personnel and kits
Note: Flags indicate national team as has been defined under FIFA eligibility rules. Players may hold more than one non-FIFA nationality.

League table

Results

First half of season

Second half of season

Second Division play-offs
Times are BST (UTC+1)

Semi-finals
The fourth placed team in the Third Division (Elgin City ) will play the ninth placed team in the Second Division ( Albion Rovers ) and third placed team in the Third Division (Stranraer ) will play the second placed team in the Third Division (Queen's Park ). The play-offs will be played over two legs, the winning team in each semi-final will advance to the final.

First legs

Second legs

Final
The two semi-final winners will play each other over two legs. The winning team will be awarded a place in the 2012–13 Second Division.  However, in July 2012, following discussions as a result of the sale of Rangers FC in administration to Charles Green, the result was moot;  both teams were awarded a place in the Second Division.

First leg

Second leg

Statistics

Top goalscorers

Hat-tricks

 4 Player scored 4 goals

Awards

References

Scottish Second Division seasons
2011–12 Scottish Football League
3
Scot